Palacio Municipal de Deportes de Granada is an arena in Granada, Spain. Opened in 1991, the arena holds 9,507 people and it is primarily used for basketball and the home arena of Fundación CB Granada, since 2015. The arena hosted the 1999 UEFA Futsal Championship and the Group A in EuroBasket 2007.

In 2014, the arena hosted the Group of Spain in the 2014 FIBA Basketball World Cup.

Events hosted
 1999 UEFA Futsal Championship
 EuroBasket 2007
 2014 FIBA Basketball World Cup
 2015 Winter Universiade

Attendances
This is a list of league games attendances at Palacio de Deportes.

References

External links
Patronato Municipal de Deportes

Granada
Granada
Granada
Sports venues in Andalusia
1991 establishments in Spain
Sports venues completed in 1991